Viviane dos Santos Araújo (March 25, 1975 in Rio de Janeiro) is a Brazilian photographic model, actress and reality television personality.

Career
Araújo is best known for being the rainha de bateria of samba schools Mancha Verde in São Paulo and Salgueiro in Rio, and the winner of the fifth season of the Brazilian version of The Farm.

Filmography

A Fazenda
On May 28, 2012, Viviane Araújo was officially announced by host Britto Junior as one of the sixteen celebrity contestants on the fifth season of A Fazenda, the Brazilian version of reality series The Farm, which aired on Rede Record.

On August 29, 2012, after 93 days, she was crowned the winner of the season, beating actor Felipe Folgosi and drag queen Leo Aquila in the final vote, taking home the R$2 million prize.

Personal life
Araújo married pagode singer  (Marcelo Pires Vieira) in 1998. However, after nine years, the couple announced their separation in 2007.

References

External links
Viviane Araújo's official website

1975 births
Living people
People from Rio de Janeiro (city)
Brazilian female models
Reality show winners
The Farm (TV series) winners